This is a list of members of the Belgian Senate during the 53rd legislature, after the elections of 2010. They are arranged alphabetically by type.

Seat division

Bureau

President and Vice-Presidents

College of Quaestors

Floor leaders

Alphabetically

By type

Senators by Right

Directly elected senators
They have taken the oath of office on July 6, 2010.

Dutch electoral college (25)

French electoral college (15)

Community Senators
They have taken the oath of office on July 13, 2010.

Flemish Community (10)

French-speaking Community (10)

German-speaking Community (1)

Coopted Senators
They have taken the oath of office on July 20, 2010.

Dutch language group (6)

French language group (4)

By political party

Dutch-speaking

New Flemish Alliance (14)

Christian Democratic & Flemish (7)

Socialist Party–Different (7)

Open Flemish Liberals and Democrats (6)

Flemish Interest (4 (−1))

Green (2)

Independent (1)

French-speaking

Socialist Party (12/13)

German speaking:

Reformist Movement (8)

Ecolo (5)

Humanist Democratic Centre (4)

Changed during the legislation

Senators who chose not to sit

Senators who resigned

Notes

Sources
 
 
 
 

List of Belgian Senators
Belgian Senate
2010s in Belgium